Pilar Cansino (born 18 January 1937) is a Spanish actress. She appeared in more than twenty films since 1957.

Selected filmography

References

External links 

1937 births
Living people
Spanish film actresses